Ysbyty may refer to:

Places in Wales
Ysbyty Ifan, village and community in the Conwy County Borough
Ysbyty Ystwyth, village in Ceredigion

Hospitals
Ysbyty Aneurin Bevan
Ysbyty Ystrad Fawr